The Scooby-Doo Show is an American animated mystery comedy series. The title of the series is an umbrella term for episodes of the third incarnation of Hanna-Barbera's Scooby-Doo franchise. A total of 40 episodes ran for three seasons, from 1976 to 1978, on ABC, marking the first Scooby series to appear on the network. Sixteen episodes were produced as segments of The Scooby-Doo/Dynomutt Hour in 1976, eight episodes were produced as segments of  Scooby's All-Star Laff-A-Lympics in 1977 and sixteen episodes were produced in 1978, with nine of them running by themselves under the Scooby-Doo, Where Are You! name and the final seven as segments of Scooby's All-Stars.

Despite the yearly changes in the way they were broadcast, the 1976–1978 stretch of Scooby-Doo episodes represents, at three seasons, the longest-running format of the original show before the addition of Scrappy-Doo. The episodes from all three seasons have been rerun under the title The Scooby-Doo Show since 1980; these Scooby episodes did not originally air under this title. The credits on these syndicated versions all feature a 1976 copyright date, even though season 2 and 3 were originally produced in 1977 and 1978. Outside the United States, reruns aired on CBBC in the United Kingdom until 2015. Like many animated series created by Hanna-Barbera in the 1970s, the show contained a laugh track created by the studio.

Overview
When television executive Fred Silverman moved from CBS to ABC in 1975, the Scooby-Doo gang followed him, making their ABC debut in 1976 as part of The Scooby-Doo/Dynomutt Hour. This hour-long package show featured 16 new half-hour adventures in the original Scooby-Doo, Where Are You! format, with Scooby's country cousin, the Mortimer Snerd-inspired Scooby-Dum, joining the gang as a semi-regular character. In addition, Pat Stevens replaced Nicole Jaffe as the voice of Velma. The other half of the hour was filled by Dynomutt, Dog Wonder, a new Hanna-Barbera cartoon about a superhero named the Blue Falcon and his goofy mechanical canine sidekick Dynomutt, Dog Wonder. The Mystery, Inc. gang made guest appearances in three of the Dynomutt, Dog Wonder segments. The show was renamed to The Scooby-Doo/Dynomutt Show when ABC added a rerun of Scooby-Doo, Where Are You! to the show in November 1976.

In 1977, ABC had a programming block called Scooby's All-Star Laff-A-Lympics. The Scooby-Doo segment of this two-hour block included eight new episodes of Scooby-Doo (two of which featured Scooby-Dum and one of which, "The Chiller Diller Movie Thriller", guest-starred Scooby-Doo and Scooby-Dum's distant female cousin, Scooby-Dee), plus reruns from the 1976–1977 season. The name of the block was changed to Scooby's All-Stars for the 1977–1978 season, when the program was shortened to an hour and a half, after the cancellation of Dynomutt. 16 half-hours of Scooby-Doo (featuring just the original five characters) were produced this season, and began airing earlier in the morning before the Scooby's All-Stars block as a third season of Scooby-Doo, Where Are You! in September. Scooby's All-Stars instead aired reruns of the 1976 and 1977 episodes for the first nine weeks of the 1978–1979 season. By November, the early-morning airing of Scooby-Doo, Where Are You! had been cancelled, and the new 1978 episodes began airing during the Scooby-Doo segment of Scooby's All-Stars.

Scooby-Doo creators Joe Ruby and Ken Spears, started working at ABC for Fred Silverman as production supervisors for the Saturday morning lineup, they were both involved in the development and production of the 1976–1977 and the 1977–1978 episodes (in 1977, they formed their own animation studio, Ruby-Spears Productions, as a competitor to Hanna-Barbera).

Cast

 Don Messick as Scooby-Doo
 Casey Kasem as Shaggy
 Frank Welker as Fred
 Heather North as Daphne
 Pat Stevens as Velma
 Daws Butler as Scooby-Dum

Home media
The first season was released on DVD by Warner Home Video (via Hanna-Barbera and Warner Bros. Family Entertainment) with the Dynomutt episodes they originally aired with as The Scooby-Doo/Dynomutt Hour: The Complete Series on March 7, 2006. The second season has not been released in a set, but some episodes have appeared on DVD. This leaves only four of the eight episodes in season two that ran as part of Scooby's All-Star Laff-a-Lympics as the only episodes that have not yet been released on DVD from this 40-episode incarnation. The third season was released on DVD as Scooby-Doo, Where Are You! - The Complete Third Season from Warner Home Video, H-B Cartoons and WBFE on April 10, 2007, although only nine of those originally aired under the title Scooby-Doo, Where Are You! in their initial run, and none of the third season was presented under the Where are You! title for 28 years following their broadcast debuts (the cartoons on the DVD set still feature the syndicated Scooby-Doo Show opening and closing credits). All 40 Scooby-Doo Show episodes are available for purchase and download from the iTunes Store and Amazon, as either individual episodes or a season set. The first two seasons are grouped under The Scooby-Doo Show, while the third season is listed under Scooby-Doo, Where Are You!

See also
 Laff-A-Lympics

References

External links
 

1976 American television series debuts
1978 American television series endings
1970s American mystery television series
Scooby-Doo Show
American children's animated adventure television series
American children's animated comedy television series
American children's animated horror television series
American children's animated fantasy television series
American children's animated mystery television series
1970s American animated television series
Television series by Hanna-Barbera
English-language television shows
American Broadcasting Company original programming
American animated television spin-offs
Teen animated television series
Television series created by Joe Ruby
Television series created by Ken Spears